De rode zwaan  is a 1999 Dutch film directed by Martin Lagestee.

Cast
Liz Snoyink	 ... 	Koningin Houtvolk
Rufus Heikens	... 	Jacob
Pierre Bokma	... 	Generaal
Sanne Himmelreich	... 	Neeltje
Frits Lambrechts		
Nick Majoor	... 	Vezel
Wolter Muller	... 	Prins Houtvonk
Thekla Reuten	... 	Dochter van de generaal
Ariane Schluter	... 	Dokter
André van den Heuvel	... 	Opa
Marloes van den Heuvel	... 	Moeder van Jacob
Mark van der Laan	... 	Patrouille Commadant
Joost van der Stel	... 	Kwajongen

External links 
 

Dutch fantasy films
1999 films
1990s Dutch-language films